Maëlle Grossetête (born 10 April 1998) is a French professional racing cyclist, who currently rides for UCI Women's WorldTeam .

Major results

2015
 National Junior Road Championships
2nd Time trial
6th Road race
 4th Trofeo Da Moreno - Piccolo Trofeo Alfredo Binda
2016
 3rd Time trial, National Junior Road Championships
 6th Overall Albstadt-Frauen-Etappenrennen
2017
 10th Time trial, National Road Championships
2018
 2nd Kreiz Breizh Elites Dames
 6th Time trial, UEC European Under–23 Road Championships
 7th Time trial, National Road Championships
2019
 National Under–23 Road Championships
1st  Time trial
7th Road race
 5th Grand Prix International d'Isbergues
2020
 4th Mixed team relay, UEC European Road Championships
 National Road Championships
7th Time trial
10th Road race
2021
 7th Ronde de Mouscron

References

External links
 

1998 births
Living people
French female cyclists
Sportspeople from Haute-Savoie
European Games competitors for France
Cyclists at the 2019 European Games
Cyclists from Auvergne-Rhône-Alpes
21st-century French women